Oh! Heavenly Dog is a 1980 American fantasy comedy film written by Rod Browning and stars Benjean, billed here as Benji (she was the daughter of Higgins, who originated the role of Benji), Chevy Chase, Jane Seymour, and Omar Sharif.  The film was directed by Joe Camp and released by 20th Century Fox.

It was the third film in the Benji series.

Plot
On a rainy day in London, private investigator Benjamin Browning (Chevy Chase) accepts a ride from his friend, Freddie (Alan Sues), who is a dangerous driver. As Freddie drops Benjamin near his office, the investigator collides on the street with writer Jackie Howard (Jane Seymour). When Benjamin asks her for a date, she tells him to contact her upon her return from Paris. Back at his office, Benjamin's secretary, Margaret (Barbara Leigh-Hunt), leaves for lunch, and a stranger named Quimby Charles (Richard Vernon), claiming to be a member of Parliament, proposes to hire Benjamin as a bodyguard for a friend, Mrs. Patricia Elliot (Marguerite Corriveau). Benjamin is uncertain, but Quimby offers a great deal of money. Benjamin accepts the assignment and goes to visit Patricia at her flat, where he discovers the door unlocked. As he searches the residence, decorated with artwork, he discovers Patricia dead on the bedroom floor, bleeding from a knife wound. Suddenly, an intruder fatally stabs Benjamin, steals Patricia's gold pendant and leaves.

In the afterlife, Benjamin awakens at an "intermediate destination evaluation facility", where a counselor named Mr. Higgins (Stuart Germain) informs Benjamin of his death. Before Benjamin can enter heaven or hell, he must complete an assignment that requires him to return to life to solve his own murder. Seeing a front-page newspaper story about the crime, Benjamin realizes that a man impersonated Quimby. Benjamin soon learns, much to his annoyance, that he will return to life in a dog's body. As Browning the dog, Benjamin lands in Paris and hitches a ride in Jackie's car.

In London, he searches for his killer, and is thrown out of Carlton Court, the building where he was murdered. Behind the hotel, Benjamin converses with Freddie, who has been reincarnated as a cat after being killed in a car accident. Freddie directs him to Patricia's flat, where he wanders around, searching for clues, while Malcolm Bart (Omar Sharif), the man who pretended to be Quimby, watches from a closet. Browning notices a telephone number in Patricia's calendar, marked on the day before he died. Using a pencil to dial a rotary phone, Browning discovers the phone number is the Needham Gallery. Soon, Browning sees Jackie in a conversation with the building manager. When the manager threatens to notify Scotland Yard about the dog, Browning disappears. As Margaret cleans out Benjamin's office, Browning appears. Jackie arrives, wanting to interview Margaret about the crime for a book she is writing. Margaret shows Jackie a photograph of Benjamin; and the writer realizes that she met him the day he was killed. Meanwhile, Jackie mentions that she lives at the Stanley Towers, and later, Browning follows her there. Jackie interviews Quimby at Scotland Yard, who insists on access to her research, which he hopes will clear his name as a suspect. Jackie soon visits the Needham Gallery, and leaves Browning in her parked car. There, she meets Montanero, an artist whose work Patricia often used in her interior design work, and Jackie invites him to her flat for dinner. Jackie is introduced to Alistair Becket (John Stride), an up-and-coming candidate for prime minister, who shows great interest in her book. Browning searches the gallery, and soon sees Jackie talking to Bart, the killer. At the sight of the dog on Jackie's lap, Bart becomes nervous and leaves. Browning wiggles free from Jackie's grasp and follows Bart.

Jackie later asks for Patricia's client list, but her building manager refuses. Later still, Jackie interviews Becket, and asks his help to gain access to Patricia's flat. He then summons Bart, his assistant. While the men talk with Jackie, a painting of the Swiss Alps hanging in Becket's office reminds Browning that Patricia vacationed there, and he suspects a connection. Later in Patricia's flat, Browning sees Bart remove evidence. Suddenly, Mr. Higgins appears, and temporarily switches the dog back to his human form to warn him that a mistake was made. His dog body will expire sooner than expected, and he will have to leave before he solves his murder. Benjamin protests, and says he will not leave before the crime is solved.

Meanwhile, Becket alerts Jackie that her dog was found by building security, and is being held in Bart's office. Browning sees a calendar entry on Bart's desk, noting Becket's birthday and a street address. When Jackie notices the entry, she wishes Becket a happy birthday. However, he says that his birthday is 3 March not October, and casually invites her to lunch. Browning soon investigates the address, which is a post office, and decides to search postal box no. thirty-three, based on the numerals of Becket's birthday. Browning grabs a letter out of the box and escapes. At Jackie's apartment, Browning rips open the envelope to find Patricia's pendant with the word "ALP" stamped on the back. Upon realizing the letters stand for "Alistair loves Patricia", Browning searches Jackie's police photographs and notices that Patricia was no longer wearing the pendent. He deduces that Patricia became a political liability for the married Becket once he intended to run for prime minister, and she became engaged to his rival, Quimby. Therefore, Becket and Bart schemed to get rid of her. Browning grabs the pendent in his mouth and heads to Jackie's lunch. However, Bart chases him until Browning runs into an alley. There, Browning transforms into human form, and Mr. Higgins appears, saying Benjamin's time on Earth is over. Bart is shaken to see Benjamin, and leaves after the dog is nowhere to be found.

Meanwhile, Benjamin will not cooperate with Higgins, and shows up at the restaurant as Browning with the pendant in his mouth. Becket grabs the pendant away from Jackie, and accuses her of derailing his plan to become prime minister. Browning turns on Jackie's tape recorder just as Becket confesses his love for Patricia. When Jackie accuses Becket of murder, Bart appears and confesses to the crime. After twelve years preparing Becket to become prime minister, Bart did not want Patricia to ruin their political ambitions. Bart is arrested when he tries to shoot Browning but accidentally hits Jackie instead as she sacrifices herself to protect the dog. Although, Browning is miserable over Jackie's death, he is overjoyed to be reunited with her when she returns to Earth as a cat.

Cast

Production
Chase later said Camp "came to me  with a script that I thought was very  funny. I said yes, did it and left after six weeks."

The film was shot in London, Paris and Montreal. Because of England's quarantine laws – which required dogs to be in quarantine for six months – the scenes with Benji were shot in Montreal's old city.

Chase says after he left Camp "shot the rest of the scenes with the dog and  changed all the lines. I had to come back, go onto the looping stage and loop completely different dialogue than I had read in the script. It was very infuriating; I was so upset that to this day I have never actually seen the movie."

Behind the scenes
Outtakes and behind-the-scenes footage from this film were used in making the short feature Benji at Work (1980), a 30-minute documentary about the career of Benjean as a dog actor.

Reception
In his one star review, critic Roger Ebert stated it was not nearly as funny as the Saturday Night Live ads it could have inspired, calling it a "total miscalculation from beginning to end". Janet Maslin called it a film that "Shows few signs of life, and many signs of depressing modernism".

See also
 You Never Can Tell (1951 film)
 Fluke (1995 film)
 Quigley (2003 film)
 A Dog's Purpose (2017 film)

References

External links 
 
 
 
 

1980 films
1980s crime comedy films
1980s fantasy comedy films
American crime comedy films
American detective films
American fantasy comedy films
Benji
Films about dogs
Films about the afterlife
Films about reincarnation
Films directed by Joe Camp
Films scored by Euel Box
Films set in London
Resurrection in film
20th Century Fox films
1980 comedy films
1980s English-language films
1980s American films